The Dodson House, also known as the Dodson-Himelright House, is a historic house in Humboldt, Tennessee, U.S..

History
The house was built in 1894 for William Dodson, a real estate developer. It was inherited by his son George, an attorney, in 1904, who lived here until his death in 1931. It was then inherited by George's son, William Hooper Dodson, the owner of the Dodson Ford dealership.

The house was later purchased by the Himelright family.

Architectural significance
The house was designed in the Queen Anne architectural style. It has been listed on the National Register of Historic Places since March 25, 1982.

References

National Register of Historic Places in Gibson County, Tennessee
Queen Anne architecture in Tennessee
Houses completed in 1894